Pseudohemiculter is a genus of cyprinid fish occurring in eastern Asia.  There are currently four species in the genus.

Species
 Pseudohemiculter dispar (W. K. H. Peters, 1881)
 Pseudohemiculter hainanensis (Boulenger, 1900)
 Pseudohemiculter kweichowensis (D. S. Tang, 1942)
 Pseudohemiculter pacboensis V. H. Nguyễn, 2001

References
 

 
Cyprinid fish of Asia
Cyprinidae genera